Roman Seljak (27 September 1934 – 8 April 1994) was a Slovenian cross-country skier. He competed in the men's 15 kilometre event at the 1964 Winter Olympics.

References

1934 births
1994 deaths
Slovenian male cross-country skiers
Olympic cross-country skiers of Yugoslavia
Cross-country skiers at the 1964 Winter Olympics
People from Žiri